"It's the Real Thing" is a 1989 song by American R&B singer Angela Winbush. It is the lead single from her second studio album, The Real Thing. The track was an R&B hit which peaked to number two on the R&B Singles chart. Actor Don Cheadle appears in the music video for the song.

Track listing
US, Vinyl 12" Single

Charts

Weekly charts

Year-end charts

References

Angela Winbush songs
1989 singles
Songs written by Angela Winbush
1989 songs
PolyGram singles